Mycobacteroides chelonae (formerly Mycobacterium chelonae) is a species of bacteria from the phylum Actinomycetota belonging to the genus Mycobacteroides. Mycobacteroides chelonae is a rapidly growing mycobacterium that is found all throughout the environment, including sewage and tap water. It can occasionally cause opportunistic infections of humans.

It is grouped in Runyon group IV.

The complete genome sequence of the M. chelonae CCUG 47445 type strain was deposited and published in DNA Data Bank of Japan, European Nucleotide Archive, and GenBank in 2016 under the accession number CP007220.

Epidemiology
On average, two cases of nonpulmonary M. chelonae infection are reported in South Australia each year. This bacterium is capable of causing skin, soft tissue, and bone infections, particularly after trauma and surgery. It has been documented as a cause of breast infections after nipple piercing.

References

Further reading

External links
Type strain of Mycobacteroides chelonae at BacDive - the Bacterial Diversity Metadatabase

Acid-fast bacilli
chelonae
Bacteria described in 1923